Iwon may refer to:

 Iwon or Iwŏn, the common South Korean romanization of
 Riwon (Riwŏn-ŭp), a town in North Korea
 Riwon County (Riwŏn-kun), a county in North Korea
 Iwon station (이원역, Iwon-yeok) on the Gyeongbu Line in South Korea
 iWon, an internet portal and search engine